Sneed Body Collard III (born November 7, 1959) is an American author.

On November 4, 2006, Collard received the Washington Post/Children's Book Guild Award, presented annually to "an author or illustrator whose total body of work has contributed significantly to the quality of nonfiction for children."
In 2006, Collard also received the American Association for the Advancement of Science (AAAS) award for his science book The Prairie Builders: Reconstructing America's Lost Grasslands.
Collard has written more than 80 books for young people, including Shep—Our Most Loyal Dog, Fire Birds: Valuing Natural Wildfires and Burned Forests, Hopping Ahead of Climate Change: Snowshoe Hares, Science, and Survival, and Dog Sense. He is also the author of an adult memoir, Warblers & Woodpeckers: A Father-Son Big Year of Birding (2018, Mountaineers Books) and a professional development textbook, Teaching Nonfiction Revision: A Professional Writer Shares Strategies, Tips, and Lessons (Heinemann, 2017).

His articles have appeared in Environmental Action, The Humanist, Florida Wildlife, Islands, Cricket, and Highlights for Children.

Biography 

Collard has been a farmer, computer scientist, and author.

The son of farmers, Collard says that he fell in love with the agricultural field at an early age, watching livestock with his mother and growing corn, wheat, and various other crops with his father.

"My parents were both farmers and surrounded me with agriculture all the time".
Collard began writing after graduating with honors in agriculture and forestry from the University of California at Berkeley. He earned a master's in agriculture genetics at the University of California in Santa Barbara, after which he worked as a crop analyst for several major agricultural companies.

As of 2019 Collard lives in Montana where he continues to write books and articles for young people. He also visits schools and conferences  giving talks and workshops to children and educators.

Children's nonfiction books 

Selected science books:

 1994 Green Giants
 1994 Smart Survivors
 1994 Tough Terminators
 1996 Alien Invaders—The Continuing Threat of Exotic Species
 1996 Our Natural Homes: Exploring Terrestrial Biomes of North and South America (Our Perfect Planet)
 1997 Animal Dads
 1997 Creepy Creatures (Formerly titled Do They Scare You? Creepy Creatures)
 1997 Monteverde (Venture Books—Science)
 1998 Animal Dazzlers
 1998 Our Wet World: Exploring Earth's Aquatic Ecosystems
 1999 1,000 Years Ago on Planet Earth
 2000 Acting for Nature
 2000 Animal Dads
 2000 Birds of Prey: A Look at Daytime Raptors (Watts Library)
 2000 Making Animal Babies
 2000 The Forest in the Clouds
 2002 Beaks!
 2002 Leaving Home
 2003 B is for Big Sky Country: A Montana Alphabet (Discover America State by State)
 2004 Animals Asleep
 2005 A Platypus, Probably
 2005 One Night in the Coral Sea
 2005 The Prairie Builders: Reconstructing America's Lost Grasslands (Scientists in the Field Series)
 2006 On the Coral Reefs (Science Adventures)
 2006 In the Deep Sea (Science Adventures)
 2006 In the Wild (Science Adventures)
 2006 In the Rain Forest (Science Adventures)
 2006 Shep: Our Most Loyal Dog (True Story)
 2007 Pocket Babies: And Other Amazing Marsupials (Junior Library Guild Selection)
 2008 Science Warriors: The Battle Against Invasive Species (Scientists in the Field Series)
 2009 Many Biomes, One Earth (rereleased version of Our Natural Homes)
 2010 The World Famous Miles City Bucking Horse Sale
 2011 Acting for Nature: What Young People Around The World Have Done To Protect The Environment
 2012 Global Warming—A Personal Guide to Causes and Solutions
 2012 Sneed B. Collard III's Most Fun Book Ever About Lizards
 2014 A Listen to Patriotic Music
 2014 A Look at Cubism
 2014 Drones and War Marchines
 2014 The CIA and FBI: Top Secret
 2014 U.S. Air Force: Absolute Power
2015 Fire Birds: Valuing Natural Wildfires and Burned Forests
 2016 Hopping Ahead of Climate Change: Snowshoe Hares, Science, and Survival
2017 Catching Air: Taking the Leap with Gliding Animals
2018 Woodpeckers: Drilling Holes & Bagging Bugs
2018 One Iguana, Two Iguanas: A Story of Accident, Natural Selection, and Evolution
2019 Birds of Every Color

Children's and young adult fiction 

 2005 Dog Sense
 2006 Flash Point
 2009 Double Eagle
 2011 The Governor's Dog is Missing (Slate Stephens Mysteries)
 2011 Hangman's Gold (Slate Stephens Mysteries)
 2012 Cartwheel: A Sequel to Double Eagle
 2014 Dog 4491

Adult nonfiction 

 2017 Teaching Nonfiction Revision: A Professional Writer Shares Strategies, Tips, and Lessons
2018 Warblers and Woodpeckers: A Father-Son Big Year of Birding

Selected awards 
 1995 Lud Browman Award for body of work, given by the University of Montana Friends of the Mansfield Library
 1997, 1998 Society of Children's Book Writers and Illustrators Magazine Merit Award
 2005 ASPCA Henry Bergh Award for Dog Sense
 2005 ASPCA Henry Bergh Award for The Prairie Builders
 2006 Washington Post-Children's Book Guild Nonfiction Award Winner: Sneed B. Collard III
 2006 AAAS Prize for Excellence in Science Books for The Prairie Builders
 2006 ASPCA Henry Bergh Award for Flash Point
 2007 Green Earth Book Award for Flash Point
2008 Treasure State Award for Shep—Our Most Loyal Dog
 2009 Green Earth Book Award for Science Warriors (Honor Book)
 2009 Children's Gallery Award for Shep—Our Most Loyal Dog
 2011 High Plains Book Award (Finalist) for The World Famous Miles City Bucking Horse Sale (Finalist)
 2011 Green Earth Book Award for Global Warming (Honor Book)
 2014 Dog 4491 finalist for the Green Earth Book Award
2016 Green Prize for Fire Birds: Valuing Natural Wildfires and Burned Forests
2016 Eureka! Book Award for Excellence in Nonfiction for Young Readers for Fire Birds: Valuing Natural Wildfires and Burned Forests
2017 Eureka! Book Award for Excellence in Nonfiction for Young Readers for Hopping Ahead of Climate Change
2017 High Plains Book Award for Hopping Ahead of Climate Change
AAAS/Subaru/SB&F Prize for Excellence in Science Books (Finalist) for Hopping Ahead of Climate Change
2018 Montana Book Award (Honor Book) for Warblers and Woodpeckers: A Father-Son Big Year of Birding
2019 High Plains Book Award (Finalist) for Warblers and Woodpeckers: A Father-Son Big Year of Birding

References

External links 

 
 PBS WETA-TV Reading Rockets project 
 A video interview with Sneed Collard

1959 births
American science writers
Living people